BMN may refer to:

 Beijing Media Network, a television network in China
 Bloc of National Minorities, a political party in the Second Polish Republic
 the ISO 639-3 code for the Bina language (Papua New Guinea)
 the National Rail station code for Bromley North railway station, London, England
 BMN Painter, an Attic vase painter active during the 6th century BC